Locusts (also called Locusts: Day of Destruction outside the United States) is a natural horror television film directed by David Jackson, and starring Lucy Lawless, Dylan Neal, John Heard and Gregory Alan Williams as a group of scientists, farmers and government officials as they attempt to stop a swarm of genetically engineered locusts from devouring the United States. It aired on CBS on April 24, 2005.

Plot 

At a United States Department of Agriculture (USDA) lab at the Virginia Institute of Agriculture (VIA), Gina (Amanda Baker), accompanied by her boyfriend Willy (Drew Seeley), enter one of the labs containing a swarm of Australian plague locusts in order to feed them. The locusts are contained in an independent glass room, sealed off from the lab by an inner and outer door. Willy refuses to go into the locusts, so Gina does it herself, carrying a ficus tree as food, telling Willy to seal the outer door behind her. Willy asks her if she will put on the protective suit provided but she laughs, stating they are "grasshoppers, not tarantulas". Gina unlocks the inner door using the keypad and enters the glass room carrying the ficus tree, without the protective suit. Almost straight away, the locusts begin to swarm upon her, rather than the tree. Gina escapes with the help of Willy, both shaken by what they have witnessed.

In Georgetown, Washington D.C., Maddy Rierdon (Lucy Lawless) and her boyfriend Dan Dryer (Dylan Neal) are having a romantic morning together, but it is interrupted by Maddy's phone ringing. Maddy answers to discover it is her assistant, Vivian (Esperanza Catubig), who is ringing, telling her that a lab at the VIA has been red flagged by the Government Accountability Office (GAO). When Vivian tries to investigate using her security contacts, she finds the information is classified, so Maddy requests to meet her outside the VIA in 15 minutes, much to the irritation of Dan, who has taken time from work to spend time with Maddy, who promises they will talk when she returns shortly. Maddy meets with Vivian outside, and discovers the lab in question is being overseen by Dr. Peter Axelrod (John Heard), a former professor to Maddy; she goes inside to meet him. It is revealed Maddy is now Peter's boss at the USDA.

Peter takes her to Lab C-12, the same lab Gina and Willy fled from the night before. Peter goes into the glass room containing the locusts, and extracts a single insect for himself and Maddy to take a look at, instructing her to put on a gas mask at the same time. Peter puts the insect into a sealed cage, and squirts it with DDT, a pesticide. The insect is only briefly immobilised by the DDT but recovers in mere seconds to continue flying round the cage, shocking Maddy. Peter reveals that they are his creation. They are not just Australian plague locusts, but a hybrid, crossed with the desert locust. Peter further reveals they are resistant to all known pesticides, not just DDT, that they reproduce ten times faster than normal locusts and they live longer. Maddy, horrified, proclaims it a bioweapon and orders the locusts exterminated, reluctantly firing Peter. Scientists with protective suits and flame throwers exterminate all the locusts, save for a handful, which one of the scientists puts into a tube labelled "biohazard". Whilst the exterminator clears up, he accidentally drops the jar in the sink, causing several of them to escape down the drain. The exterminator flees before his mistake can be discovered, but as he does so, the escaped locusts can be seen flying away from the building. Maddy returns to Dan several hours later than she said, but Dan has had enough, packing her a suitcase, telling her they are over. Maddy leaves to go on her next mission.

Meanwhile, at Andrews Air Force Base in Maryland, the same exterminator brings the remaining insects in a sealed metal case to a waiting officer, who delivers them on a military plane bound for Beale Air Force Base in California. When the case is offloaded onto an army truck, the officer handling it is attacked by an unknown insect, causing him to drop the case on the runway. When the army truck goes around to retrieve it, they accidentally run it over, destroying the box and releasing the remaining four insects into the air.

One month later, Maddy discovers she is pregnant and tries to call Dan to talk to him, but he is showing some international delegates around the United Nations Experimental Farm in Virginia, and she is unable to tell him before he is forced to end the call. Meanwhile, a couple camping by the American River in California wake up to discover their tent is saturated with a swarm of sleeping locusts, and they flee. A few hours later, the same swarm descends on the Napa Valley as a large black cloud, causing famers to flee. Coincidentally, Maddy, on the road in California with the USDA Voracious Insect Mobile Research Lab, sees the same swarm flying overhead. She begins to track them.

In Leesburg, Virginia, Peter, his wife Terry (Caroline McKinley) and their daughter Sofia (Jenna Hildebrand) are having breakfast. Terry leaves for work, and Peter accompanies Sofia to the bus stop on her way to school, then follows the bus in his car on his way to the gym, before the bus turns off the road to travel towards the school. Peter and Sofia wave to each other. As Peter is heading towards the gym, he hears the buzzes of insects, but cannot see them, so stops by a nearby cornfield, where the swarm of insects suddenly take off into the sky. Peter realises with horror they are his hybrid locusts, and they are heading in the direction of the school bus. The locusts swarm the school bus, attacking the children and knocking them unconscious. Peter drags the unconscious Sofia back to his car, and heads to hospital. Back in Napa Valley, Maddy and her team are on the scene of the earlier swarm's attack on the farm, revealing the locusts have stripped every single bush and tree down to the bark.

In Washington D.C., Dan is at his computer at the United Nations Field Office when he the computer beeps with an alert that reads "locust infestation advisory". Dan calls Maddy to ask her about it, but she reveals she issued it. They begin to reconcile over their earlier argument but Maddy is called away by the Secretary of Agriculture before they can finish, who asks her what is going on. In the hospital, Sofia is revealed to be comatose, looked after by Peter and Terry. Maddy calls the United States Weather Service in Oklahoma for an update on weather patterns to try to predict the two swarms' next movement. The USWS predicts the Virginia swarm will head towards the city of Pittsburgh in the coming hours but mentions they gave the same information to Peter. Maddy asks Vivian to try to get Peter on the line, a grim expression on her face.

Meanwhile, in Visalia, California, some 200 miles south east of Napa, a citrus festival is being held, attended by many families. Peter calls Maddy as the latter passes a sign for the festival, revealing they are his locusts that are swarming. Peter tries to help Maddy but she refuses, wanting him as far from the locusts as possible. Maddy realises as she passes the sign for the festival that's where they will strike next. Maddy and her team begin to evacuate the festival in advance of the locusts, but Vivian reveals the swarm is just minutes away, and both the festival and the team are attacked by the swarm. A dropped video camera records the event.

In Pittsburgh, a hot dog retailer sets up his stand ready for lunch in the city centre, sunlight glinting on the tall glass buildings of the city. True to the USWS's predictions, the swarm begins to reach the city, their huge black cloud noticed by the workers in the city's many tall buildings. Pandemonium erupts in the streets, as the locusts are shown to be swarming in the streets and entering the office buildings via the air vents. At Pittsburgh International Airport, Air Traffic Control are overseeing the take off of a cargo plane, watched by Peter. Peter tries to get Ruby (Mikki Val), the lead air traffic controller, not to launch planes to the north east, as the locusts are heading from that direction. Ruby does not take him seriously, and the cargo plane runs into the swarm, overloading the engines, causing them to fail. The plane crashes in a fiery explosion just yards from the end of the runway in full view of Ruby, who realises her mistake too late.

Back at the hospital, Peter and Terry see the news, which broadcasts the video captured earlier at the festival by the dropped camera. Peter explains to Terry that they are his locusts, angering Terry. Before they can talk further, FBI agents arrive and escort Peter to federal custody. Meanwhile, at the Department for Homeland Security, a meeting takes place between Maddy, her boss Secretary Morales (Mike Gomez), General Miller (Gregory Alan Williams), Senator Clauson (Margaret Lawhon), Director Rusk (Mark Costello), and Lorelei Wentworth (Natalija Nogulich) to determine the course of action required. Maddy's former boyfriend Dan is also in attendance as a crop expert. General Miller is not convinced they are a threat, but changes his mind when he sees the evidence, warning Secretary Morales privately he may not have his job much longer and proposing the military use weapons against them. Dan recommends bringing in the harvest early across the country to try and starve the locusts. During the meeting, Director Rusk receives a call stating the eastern swarm of locusts have now turned carnivorous. At Maddy's request, Vivian locates Peter, who is being held at Fort Douglas, a bioweapons facility.

The FBI reveal to Peter they plan to dump extremely toxic VX gas, a nerve agent, on the locusts to kill them; Peter is uneasy. Maddy pleads with General Miller to help her speak to Peter, he relents and they travel to Fort Douglas to meet him, where Peter reveals to Maddy about the VX nerve gas. Maddy is furious, likening it to a nuclear bomb, but she reluctantly boards a helicopter with General Miller and Peter for a test run over the eastern swarm in Ohio, Miller promising Maddy it will only be used on rural areas with little to no population. Maddy questions its legality, but Miller retorts that it has been authorised by the President. Whilst they board the helicopter, Maddy discreetly makes a call to the news, informing them of the VX nerve gas test run. However, when they are airborne, the USWS informs the group the swarm over Ohio they would be targeting has moved towards southern Indiana and Miller continues to press ahead with the plans. Maddy and Peter are horrified, as southern Indiana is more populated than Ohio, pleading with Miller to turn around, but Miller coldly replies he never said there would not be fatalities. Maddy, desperate, begins using a spanner to smash the VX container on board the helicopter, forcing Miller to turn around before the gas is released, which would cause all on board to die. The helicopter is ordered to turn around regardless when the national news breaks stories of the VX gas being used, as the mission relied on secrecy. Miller is furious.

Maddy calls Dan, asking him to check on her grandfather, Lyle (Mike Farrell), whose farm is in Indiana and thus right in the path of the locusts. Dan leaves immediately for Indiana. Lyle begins gathering the cattle and moving them indoors in advance of the swarm, helped by Maddy and Peter, who arrive in a military vehicle, and by Dan who arrives just as the swarm approaches. They take shelter in a metal grain silo just in time, but as they do so, Maddy notices the electric fly trap on the outside has killed a few locusts. This gives Maddy the idea to use the generator inside the silo to send an electric current to the outside of the grain silo, hopefully killing them. The only problem is the generator has no fuel, the only fuel available is on the other side of the farm. Peter volunteers to go and get it, given that he created them, and covers himself with a sheet to try and protect himself. The swarm attack him immediately and though he makes it back inside, he is covered in bites and blood, revealing the swarm are indeed carnivorous. Lyle loads up the generator and Dan attaches the cables to the metal shell of the silo, sending a powerful current through it. The part of the swarm that attacked the grain silo are killed, but Peter has lost too much blood, and dies. Armed with the knowledge on how to kill them, Dan and Maddy race back to Washington D.C. before the VX gas is used again.

At the Department for Homeland Security, the debate continues on how to deal with them, those in the meeting reluctantly agreeing to Miller's plan to use the toxic VX gas on both swarms as there is no alternative. Maddy and Dan enter the debate and try to convince the others they know how to kill them without killing the human population too - they can use electricity. Miller does not believe it can work, calling it "fantasy" and Secretary Morales, Maddy's boss, angrily tells them to sit down, but the quiet Lorelei Wentworth defends Dan and Maddy, revealing she is the Secretary for the Department of Energy, and that it may indeed be possible to create a massive electric current to kill the swarms, as both swarms are approaching the Continental Power Grids. If the United States switches off their electricity, she can re-route the unused power through the grids, causing a massive electrical current and expanding the electrical field beyond the wires. This persuades Senator Clauson to support the electricity plan, especially as it means not dumping a nerve agent on her people. Director Rusk gives the go ahead for the plan to increase the electricity current through the power lines, but General Miller is skeptical, and warns he will act when the plan does not work.

Dan is concerned that the locust swarms will not be attracted to the current, but Maddy has a flashback - the locusts are attracted to bright light, hence why they attacked the glass office buildings in Pittsburgh and the metal grain silo, both of which reflected sunlight. Maddy calls the USWS again, who agree to launch weather balloons near the power lines in an attempt to attract them. At dawn the next day, power is switched off throughout the United States and rerouted to the two power lines, one each in western and eastern America. Meanwhile, preparations continue in Utah for a launch of VX gas should the electricity plan fail. Maddy and Dan arrive at one of the two sites, and instruct the Air Force to move the weather balloons closer to the power lines, otherwise they will not work. Maddy and Dan reconcile, but just as they are about to kiss, the swarm arrives and they retreat to their car for safety. Wentworth activates the power grid, and the swarms fly into the massively amplified power cables. The cables burst into flames with the amount of current, exploding the transformers, but the plan works, the locust swarms are killed by the electricity. Those in the Department of Homeland Security meeting celebrate, but Secretary Morales reverses the situation on General Miller, warning him he might not have a job much longer for wanting to gas the American people.

One year later, Maddy and Dan have a child together. Maddy receives a call about her next work, but consults with Dan before she accepts, as she finally accepts family time is more important than her job.

Cast 
 Lucy Lawless as Dr. Maddy Rierdon
 Dylan Neal as Dr. Dan Dryer
 John Heard as Dr. Peter Axelrod
 Gregory Alan Williams as General Miller
 Mike Farrell as Lyle Rierdon
 Natalija Nogulich as Lorelei Wentworth
 Mike Gomez as Secretary Morales
 Esperanza Catubig as Vivian
 Sam Temeles as Wyatt Reynolds
 Mark Costello as Director Rusk
 Margaret Lawhon as Senator Clauson
 Caroline McKinley: Terry Axelrod
 D.J. Dierker as Jonas Hanauer
 Nicolas Roye as Jimmy
 Drew Seeley as Willy
 Joel Steingold as Cargo Pilot
 Chaz Roberson as School Bus Driver
 Jenna Hildebrand as Sofia Axelrod
 Lara Grice as Felicia
 Amanda Baker as Gina
 Greg Corbett as Karl
 Azure Parsons: Stacy
 Marcus Lyle Brown as FBI Agent
 Wayne Ferrara as Military Officer
 Dave Nemeth as Newscaster
 Abdoulaye Camara as African Translator
 Mikki Val as Ruby

External links

References 

CBS network films
2005 films
2005 television films
2005 horror films
American natural horror films
Films about insects
2000s American films